Freda Smith may refer to:

 Freda Smith (clergy), American minister and political activist
 Freda Love Smith, American musician, journalist and author
 Freda Pemberton Smith (1902–1991), Canadian landscapist and portraitist